Sione Misiloi (born 3 November 1994 in New Zealand) is a New Zealand rugby union player who plays for the  in Super Rugby. His playing position is flanker. He has signed for the Highlanders squad in 2020.

Reference list

External links
itsrugby.co.uk profile

1994 births
New Zealand rugby union players
Living people
Rugby union flankers
Rugby union number eights
Otago rugby union players
Highlanders (rugby union) players
Southland rugby union players
People educated at St Kevin's College, Oamaru